Cathelean Marie du Plessis is a South African born, former international lawn bowls competitor for Namibia.

Bowls career
In 1993, she won the pairs bronze medal with Anne Ainsworth, at the inaugural Atlantic Bowls Championships.

In 1998 she won a silver medal at the 1998 Commonwealth Games in the pairs with Lynne Lindsay-Payne.

References

1941 births
South African female bowls players
Namibian bowls players
Bowls players at the 1998 Commonwealth Games
Commonwealth Games medallists in lawn bowls
Commonwealth Games silver medallists for Namibia
Living people
Medallists at the 1998 Commonwealth Games